Pendleton Airport  is located  northwest of Pendleton, Ontario, Canada, east of Ottawa. The airfield is currently operated by the Gatineau Gliding Club.

History

World War II (1942–1945)

During the Second World War, Pendleton Airport was established as RCAF Station Pendleton and hosted No. 10 Elementary Flying Training School for the British Commonwealth Air Training Plan after the school moved from Hamilton in 1942. The school provided initial pilot training on Tiger Moth and Finch aircraft. While most of the airports involved in the plan have either closed or gone through extensive changes, Pendleton still preserves most of the original character of a BCATP airport: it has the original three short runways arranged in a triangle (though some are in disrepair), and several of the original World War II buildings, including the main hangar.

Aerodrome information
Three runways were listed as follows:

Post-war (1945–present)
The Gatineau Gliding Club purchased the airfield from Crown Assets in 1961, and has been the owner since then. The club is a non-profit organization dedicated to promoting motorless flight in Canada.

See also
 List of airports in the Ottawa area

References

External links
Gatineau Gliding Club
Page about this airport on COPA's Places to Fly airport directory
Soaring Association of Canada
Video: landing at the Pendleton Airport from a motor-glider cockpit

Registered aerodromes in Ontario
Pendleton, Ontario
Pendleton, Ontario
Royal Canadian Air Force stations
Military airbases in Ontario
Military history of Ontario